Six ships and a naval air station of the Royal Navy have been named HMS Sparrowhawk after the bird of prey, the Eurasian sparrowhawk:

  was an 18-gun  launched in 1807 and sold in 1841.
  was a wooden screw gunboat launched in 1856 and sold in 1872; later a merchant barque, then coal lighter, name unchanged.
  was a survey schooner purchased in 1877. She was originally named Falcon, was HMS Lark on being purchased, but was renamed HMS Sparrowhawk three months later. She was sold in 1889.
  was a  launched in 1895 and wrecked in 1904.
  was an  launched in 1912.
  was an  launched in 1918 and scrapped in 1931.
 HMS Sparrowhawk was the name given to RNAS Hatston, a naval air station of the Fleet Air Arm during World War II .

See also
 

Royal Navy ship names